Eva Leonidovna Polna (born 19 May 1975 in Leningrad, now Saint Petersburg) is a Russian singer, composer and songwriter. Polna was a member of the former Russian musical duo Gosti iz budushchego between 1996 and 2009. In 2013, Eva Polna was most rotated musical artist from Russia and CIS. Also in 2013, Polna participated in the first season of Russian TV show Odin v odin!.

A song by Vintage titled "Eva", is dedicated to Eva Polna.

Personal life 
In 2001, Polna came out as bisexual. In 2005, Eva Polna gave birth to first of her two daughters, Eveline, father being singer Denis Klyaver of Chai Vdvoyom. In 2007 Polna gave birth to her second daughter, Amalia. Amalia's father is a Russian businessman Sergey Pilgun, with whom Polna was married until April 2010, when they divorced.

Discography

With Gosti iz budushchego 

Studio albums
 Через сотни лет… (1997)
 Время песок... (1998)
 Беги от меня (1999)
 Зима в сердце (2000)
 Это сильнее меня, часть 1 (2000)
 Ева (2002)
 Это сильнее меня, часть 2 (2003)
 Больше чем песни (2005)
 За звездой (2007)

Compilations
 Best (2001)
 Любовное настроение/Любовные истории (2003)

Remix albums
 Правила движения (2004)
 Реальна только музыка (2007)

Singles
 Я твоя киска (2008)

Solo career 
Studio albums
 Поёт любовь (2014)
 Поёт любовь LIVE Сrocus City Hall 2014 (2015)
 Лирика (Неизданное)

Singles
 Какая нелепость (with Viktor Saltykov) (2004)
 Не могу я теперь без любви (with Sergey Zhukov) (2007)
 Парни не плачут (2009)
 Не расставаясь (2010)
 Миражи (2010)
 Корабли (2011)
 Отбой (with Denis Klyaver) (2011)
 "Je T'aime (Я тебя тоже нет)" (2011)
 Весь мир на ладони (2012)
 Рыбка (tribute to Mikhey) (2012)
 Молчание (2013)
 Это не ты (2014)
 Выход (2014)
 Слова (2014)
 На последнем дыхании (2014)
 Поёт любовь (2014)
 Делай любовь со мной (2014)
 Мало (2015)

Videography

With Gosti iz budushchego 
 Беги от меня (1999)
 Не любовь (1999)
 Зима в сердце (1999)
 Игры (2000)
 Ты где то (2000)
 Это сильнее меня (2000)
 Так отважно (2001)
 Он чужой (2002)
 Метко (2002)
 Почему ты? (2003)
 Грустные сказки (2004)
 Лучшее в тебе (2005)
 Я рисую (2006)
 Мама гуд-бай! (2006)
 Реальна только музыка (2007)
 Я не для тебя (2008)
 Я твоя киска (2008)

Solo career 
 Парни не плачут (2009)
 Не расставаясь (2010)
 Миражи (2010)
 Я тебя тоже нет (Je t’aime) (2011)
 Весь мир на ладони моей (2012)
 Мало (2016)

Charts

Awards

With Gosti iz budushchego 
 1999 — Golden Gramophone Award (RUS) for the song "Я с тобой»
 2000 — Golden Gramophone Award (RUS) for the song "Ты где-то»
 2001 — Golden Gramophone Award (RUS) for the song "Ундина»
 2002 — Golden Gramophone Award (RUS) for the song "Он чужой»
 2003 — Golden Gramophone Award (RUS) for the song "Почему ты, почему навсегда»
 2009 — Golden Gramophone Award (RUS) for the song "За звездой»

Solo career 
 2011 – Golden Gramophone Award (UKR) for the song "Корабли»
 2012 – Fashion People Awards-2012 in category "Fashion voice Female»
 2012 – Golden Gramophone Award (Saint Petersburg) for the song "Я тебя тоже нет»
 2012 — Диплом Красной звезды for the song "Я тебя тоже нет»
 2013 – Red Star statuette for the song "Весь мир на ладони моей", for January and February
 2013 – Top Hit Music Awards за беспрецедентный рост ротации своих треков в радиоэфире в 2012 году
 2013 – Top Hit Music Awards как автору и исполнителю самой заказываемой на радио песни — "Я тебя тоже нет»
 2013 – Top Hit Hall Of Fame за выдающийся вклад в развитие российской популярной музыки
 2013 — Диплом и статуэтка национального чарта "Красная Звезда" for the song "Весь мир на ладони моей»

References

External links
 Official website

1975 births
Living people
Russian singer-songwriters
Russian LGBT singers
Musicians from Saint Petersburg
Bisexual musicians
Bisexual women
21st-century Russian singers
21st-century Russian women singers